Fire Station No. 12 may refer to:

Fire Station No. 12 (Birmingham, Alabama), listed on the National Register of Historic Places (NRHP)
Hose House No. 12, Evansville, IN, NRHP-listed
Engine Company 12, Washington, DC, NRHP-listed

See also
List of fire stations